Frank Etheridge Saunders (26 August 1864 – 14 May 1905) was an English international footballer, who played as a centre half.

Career
Born in Brighton, Saunders played for Swifts, and earned one cap for England in 1888. He also played numerous times for Gloucester City.

References

External links

1864 births
1905 deaths
English footballers
England international footballers
Swifts F.C. players
Gloucester City A.F.C. players
Association football central defenders